The Manifesto of the Anti-Fascist Intellectuals, written by Benedetto Croce in response to the Manifesto of the Fascist Intellectuals by Giovanni Gentile, sanctioned the irreconcilable split between the philosopher and the Fascist government of Benito Mussolini, to which he had previously given a vote of confidence on 31 October 1922. The idea of an anti-Fascist manifesto came to Giovanni Amendola, who wrote to Croce, a proclaimed anti-Fascist, for his opinions on 20 April 1925:

Croce replied a day later, saying that he would be more than willing to, but that the document ought to be short, "so as not to alienate the common folk."

The manifesto was published by the liberal newspaper Il Mondo and by the Catholic newspaper Il Popolo on 1 May 1925, which was Workers' Day, symbolically responding to the publication of the Fascist manifesto on the Natale di Roma, the founding of Rome (celebrated on 21 April). The Fascist press claimed that the Crocian manifesto was "more authoritarian" than its Fascist counterpart.

Il Mondo published three lists of prominent signatories of the manifesto, first on 1 May and then longer lists on 10 May and 22 May. Among the supporters were: 

 Luigi Albertini
 Sibilla Aleramo
 Giulio Alessio
 Corrado Alvaro
 Giovanni Amendola
 Giovanni Ansaldo
 Vincenzo Arangio-Ruiz
 Antonio Banfi
 Sem Benelli
 Piero Calamandrei
Guido Castelnuovo
 Emilio Cecchi
 Cesare de Lollis
 Floriano del Secolo
 Guido de Ruggiero
 Gaetano de Sanctis
 Francesco de Sarlo
 Luigi Einaudi
 Giorgio Errera
 Giustino Fortunato
 Eustachio Paolo Lamanna
Beppo Levi
 Giorgio Levi della Vida
 Tullio Levi-Civita
 Carlo Linati
 Attilio Momigliano
 Rodolfo Mondolfo
 Eugenio Montale
Marino Moretti
 Gaetano Mosca
 Ugo Enrico Paoli
 Giorgio Pasquali
 Giuseppe Rensi
 Francesco Ruffini
 Gaetano Salvemini
 Michele Saponaro
 Matilde Serao
 Adriano Tilgher
 Umberto Zanotti Bianco

See also
Liberal anti-fascism
Manifesto of the Fascist Intellectuals

Notes

External links
  Manifesto degli intellettuali antifascisti. This article in the Italian Wikipedia contains the text.

 
Works about Italian fascism
Anti-fascist books
Political manifestos
Anti-fascism in Italy
1925 in Italy
1925 in politics
1925 documents